William de Epworth (died after 1348) was an English-born judge and Crown official in Ireland in the reign of King Edward III. His career was marked by conflict with two other judges who contested his right to sit as a Baron of the Court of Exchequer (Ireland).Ball p.77 He also faced allegations of corruption in his conduct in another non-judicial office, which were taken very seriously, but of which he was ultimately cleared.

He was born in Epworth, Lincolnshire. He appears to have taken Holy Orders, as he is referred to as a clerk. His title "Master William Epworth" suggests that he had a University degree. He entered the royal service, and was presumably quite a senior Crown servant by 1338, when he is first heard of in Ireland as Treasurer of Ulster. He was generally referred to as a "clerk". In 1341 he was appointed steward of the royal lands in Ireland. In 1343 he was granted the watermill on Dame Street  near Dublin Castle on a lease for nine years, on condition that he repair it if necessary.

In 1340 he was appointed second Baron of the Exchequer, but faced a challenge to his position from the Irish-born judge Nicholas de Snyterby. The matter was resolved in 1342 in Epworth's favour and Snyterby stood down; he did not suffer undue hardship, since, curiously by modern standards, he also had a seat on the Court of Common Pleas (Ireland).

Epworth however now faced serious allegations of fraud and misappropriation in his dealings in his other office as steward of the royal lands. King Edward III, who had appointed him "so long as he was of good behaviour", dismissed him from the Bench, and he was imprisoned in Dublin Castle.The Justiciar of Ireland was ordered to send him to England to face his accusers. However Epworth vigorously maintained his innocence, and after a lengthy inquiry ultimately prevailed against "all sinister suspicions of him".

Epworth was removed from his controversial office of royal steward, but he was appointed Seneschal for County Dublin. As was the custom for former Barons at the time he petitioned the Privy Council of Ireland for reimbursement of his expenses incurred in travelling through the provinces, without any reward, to levy the King's debts (this was one of the principal tasks of a Baron at the time). In 1346 he brought a High Court action for trespass against Adam Pornonele. The defendant was outlawed for non-appearance, a common sanction at the, but received a royal pardon. 

Having cleared his name, he was reappointed to the Bench in 1348, but faced another challenge to his office from the Welsh-born judge John de Troye, who briefly replaced him. On this occasion Epworth was successful and de Troye stepped down, although he was allowed to retain the title Baron, and went on to hold other high offices. Epworth's date of death is not recorded.

Barons of the Irish Exchequer
People from Lincolnshire

Sources
Ball, F. Elrington The Judges in Ireland 1221-1921 London John Murray 1926
Patent Rolls Edward III
Rowberry, Ryan "The origins and development of judicial tenure "during good behaviour" to 1485" in  Law and Society in Later Medieval England and Ireland Georgia State University 2017

Footnotes